The 1963 Penn State Nittany Lions baseball team represented Pennsylvania State University in the 1963 NCAA University Division baseball season. The head coach was Chuck Bedlar, serving his 1st year.

The Nittany Lions lost in the College World Series, defeated by the Texas Longhorns.

Roster

Schedule 

! style="" | Regular Season
|- valign="top" 

|- align="center" bgcolor="#ccffcc"
| 1 || April 2 || at  || Unknown • Gettysburg, Pennsylvania || 9–0 || 1–0
|- align="center" bgcolor="#ccffcc"
| 2 || April 4 ||  || New Beaver Field • University Park, Pennsylvania || 7–3 || 2–0
|- align="center" bgcolor="#ccffcc"
| 3 || April 6 ||  || New Beaver Field • University Park, Pennsylvania || 8–6 || 3–0
|- align="center" bgcolor="#ccffcc"
| 4 || April 11 || at  || Hoy Field • Ithaca, New York || 17–0 || 4–0
|- align="center" bgcolor="#ccffcc"
| 5 || April 17 ||  || New Beaver Field • University Park, Pennsylvania || 3–1 || 5–0
|- align="center" bgcolor="#ffcccc"
| 6 || April 20 ||  || New Beaver Field • University Park, Pennsylvania || 4–5 || 5–1
|- align="center" bgcolor="#ccffcc"
| 7 || April 22 || at Bucknell || Unknown • Lewisburg, Pennsylvania || 9–1 || 6–1
|- align="center" bgcolor="#ccffcc"
| 8 || April 29 || at  || Shipley Field • College Park, Maryland || 3–2 || 7–1
|- align="center" bgcolor="#ccffcc"
| 9 || April 29 || at Maryland || Shipley Field • College Park, Maryland || 5–1 || 8–1
|-

|- align="center" bgcolor="#ccffcc"
| 10 || May 3 ||  || New Beaver Field • University Park, Pennsylvania || 6–2 || 9–1
|- align="center" bgcolor="#ffcccc"
| 11 || May 4 ||  || New Beaver Field • University Park, Pennsylvania || 1–3 || 9–2
|- align="center" bgcolor="#ffcccc"
| 12 || May 14 || at  || Unknown • Annapolis, Maryland || 5–6 || 9–3
|- align="center" bgcolor="#ffcccc"
| 13 || May 16 || at  || Unknown • Morgantown, West Virginia || 4–5 || 9–4
|- align="center" bgcolor="#ccffcc"
| 14 || May 21 || at  || Erny Field • Philadelphia, Pennsylvania || 5–0 || 10–4
|- align="center" bgcolor="#ccffcc"
| 15 || May 25 ||  || New Beaver Field • University Park, Pennsylvania || 2–1 || 11–4
|-

|-
|-
! style="" | Postseason
|- valign="top"

|- align="center" bgcolor="#ccffcc"
| 16 || May 31 || vs  || Bill Clarke Field • Princeton, New Jersey || 3–0 || 12–4
|- align="center" bgcolor="#ccffcc"
| 17 || May 31 ||  || Bill Clarke Field • Princeton, New Jersey || 11–2 || 13–4
|-

|- align="center" bgcolor="#ffcccc"
| 16 || June 10 || vs Arizona || Omaha Municipal Stadium • Omaha, Nebraska || 1–8 || 13–5
|- align="center" bgcolor="#ccffcc"
| 17 || June 11 || vs Western Michigan || Omaha Municipal Stadium • Omaha, Nebraska || 3–0 || 14–5
|- align="center" bgcolor="#ffcccc"
| 18 || June 12 || vs Texas || Omaha Municipal Stadium • Omaha, Nebraska || 4–6 || 14–6
|-

|-
|

References 

Penn State Nittany Lions baseball seasons
Penn State Nittany Lions baseball
College World Series seasons